Baradari may refer to:

 Baradari (building), a historic 12-door building structure
 Baradari (brotherhood), a Persian word for brotherhood
 Baradari, Pakistan, an area of North Karachi
 Nezahat Baradari (born 1965), German politician